The Nganasan language (formerly called , tavgiysky, or , tavgiysko-samoyedsky in Russian; from the ethnonym , tavgi) is a moribund Samoyedic language spoken by the Nganasan people.

Classification 
Nganasan is the most divergent language of the Samoyedic branch of the Uralic language family (Janhunen 1998). There are two main dialects, Avam and Vadeyev. A part of the vocabulary can be traced to elements of unknown substrate origin, which are roughly twice as common in Nganasan than in other Samoyedic languages like Nenets or Enets, and bear no apparent resemblance to the neighbouring Tungusic and Yukaghir languages. The source of this substrate remains a mystery so far.

Phonology
The language has 10 vowels and about 20 consonant phonemes.

Several bisyllabic sequences of vowels are possible:

One of the main features of Nganasan is consonant gradation, which concerns the consonant phonemes  and their nasal combinations .

Orthography
The language's Cyrillic-based alphabet was devised in the 1990s:

Grammar

Morphology

Nouns 
Nouns in Nganasan have the grammatical categories of number (singular, dual, plural), case (nominative, genitive, accusative, lative, locative, elative, prolative, comitative) and possessivity (non-possessive versus possessive forms). Nganasan lacks determiners; however, the possessive forms of second person singular and third person singular can be used to express definiteness (Katzschmann, 2008).

Pronouns 
Nganasan has personal, demonstrative, interrogative, negative and determinative pronouns. Personal pronouns are not inflected: their grammatical case forms coincide and their local case forms are expressed by the corresponding possessed forms of the postposition na-. Other pronouns are inflected like nouns (Helimski, 1998).

Verbs 
Verbs agree with their subjects in person and number, and have three conjugation types. Like other Samoyedic languages, Nganasan has the opposition of perfective and imperfective verbs.

 Conjugation 

The subjective conjugation is used when there is no object or the object is focused. The objective conjugation is used with transitive words. The reflexive conjugation is used for some intransitive verbs. Each conjugation type has its own personal endings. There are three subtypes of objective conjugation endings that correspond to object number. 

 Mood 

Nganasan has a broad mood paradigm with nine forms: indicative, imperative, interrogative, inferential, renarrative, irrealis, optative, admissive-cohortive, debitive, abessive and prohibitive. Mood forms are mostly built with the help of affixation but special particles are also sometimes used. All mood forms, except the imperative, have the same personal suffixes. Tenses are distinguished in the indicative, imperative and interrogative moods (Tereščenko, 1979).

 Aspect and tense 

Most corresponding imperfective and perfective stems have the same root, but in rare cases the roots can be different. The aspectual opposition between imperfective and perfective verbs remains semantic in most verbal forms. However, in the indicative mood it is used to express present continuous and present perfect meanings, respectively. In this case, the opposition is present formally: imperfective verbs take imperfective suffixes and the perfective ones have the perfective suffixes (Helimski, 1998). Imperfective verbs can also express future meanings. These forms are not considered tense in the strict sense. The proper tense forms of past and future include past, past perfect, future, future-in-the past (Katzschmann, 2008).

 Non-finite verb forms

Syntax

Word order 
The dominating word order in Nganasan is SOV, similar to other Samoyedic languages. However, Nganasan is considered to exhibit more freedom in word order than other languages of its group. According to Tereščenko (1979), other types of word orders are used for shifting the sentence focus, especially in emphatic speech. The focused constituent usually immediately precedes the verb. Wagner-Nagy (2010) suggests that Nganasan is similar to Hungarian in its behavior, in that its word order is determined by pragmatic factors rather than being fixed.

On the phrase level, the attributes within the noun phrase usually precede the noun and become focused when placed after it. Numerals and adjectives agree with the heads in case, and adjectives also agree with the head in number. The case agreement is only complete in grammatical cases; in locative cases the attribute gets genitive form. There are no prepositions in Nganasan, postpositions are composite parts of words and also require the attributes in genitive cases. Possession is expressed with genitive construction or by a possessive suffix attached to the possessed (Helimski, 1998; Katzschmann, 2008).

Nganasan is a pro-drop language: pronominal subjects are often omitted when the verb conjugation type is subjective (Tereščenko, 1979).

Negation 
Standard negation is expressed by negative auxiliary (ńi-) followed by the main verb in connegative form marked with ʔ, e.g. ńi-ndɨ-m konɨʔ "I do not go". All inflectional markers are taken by the negation auxiliary (Gusev, 2015). Objects in the form of personal, negative or demonstrative pronouns can be inserted between the negative auxiliary and the main verb (Wagner-Nagy, 2011). There are a few negative verbs other than ni-, such as kasa — "nearly", ləði — "vainly", əku — "maybe", and ŋuəli — "of course", but their functionality is restricted, with only ni- having a full paradigm.

Existential sentences are negated with the negative existential predicate d'aŋku or its derivative stem d'anguj-. D'aŋku can only be used in present indicative as it behaves like a noun: it takes nominal predicative endings. D'anguj- (a composite of d'aŋku and ij- "be") is used for all other tense/mood combinations.

Subordination 
Subordination is typically formed by constructions with non-finite verbal forms. Such constructions are usually placed before the constituents they modify. The relative construction is always placed immediately before the modified constituent, whereas other types of constructions allow other constituents to interfere. The word order in such construction is the same as in simple sentences (Tereščenko, 1973).

Coordination 
Coordination is most often achieved by means of intonation. Sometimes pronominal and adverbial derivatives can be used as conjunctions. For example, adverb ŋonə 'also' can be used as conjunction. The category of conjunctions may be undergoing formation under the influence of Russian (Tereščenko, 1973).

Literature 
 Gusev, V. (2015) Negation in Nganasan. In Miestamo, M., Tamm, A., Wagner-Nagy, B. (ed.) Negation in Uralic Languages, 103–312. Amsterdam: John Benjamins Publishing Company. 
 Helimski, Eugene. (1998) Nganasan. In Abondolo, Daniel (ed.), The Uralic Languages, 480–515. London: Routledge.
 Katzschmann, M. (2008) Chrestomathia Nganasanica: Texte – Übersetzung – Glossar – Grammatik, Norderstedt.

 Tereščenko, N.M.  (1986) Алфавит нганасанского языка, in Skorik P.A. (ed.), Палеоазиатские языки, Leningrad: Nauka.
 Tereščenko, N.M. (1979) Нганасанский язык, Leningrad: Nauka.
 Tereščenko, N.M. (1973) Синтакс самодийских языков, Leningrad: Nauka.
 Wagner-Nagy, B. (2002) Chrestomathia Nganasanica. (Studia Uralo-Altaica : Supplementum 10) Szeged. 
 Wagner-Nagy, B. (2010) Existential and possessive predicate phrases in Nganasan. In Gusev, V. and Widmer, A., Finnisch-Ugrische Mitteilungen, 32/33. Hamburg: Buske.
 Wagner-Nagy, B. (2011) On the typology of negation in Ob-Ugric and Samoyedic languages (MSFOu 262). Helsinki: SUS

Notes

External links

Endangered Languages of Indigenous Peoples of Siberia: The Nganasan Language
The Red Book of the Peoples of the Russian Empire: The Nganasans
Comparative Nenets–Nganasan dictionary (with Russian and English equivalents)
Nganasan multimedia dictionary
German–Nganasan glossary
Nganasanica

Languages of Russia
Northern Samoyedic languages